Veronica peregrina is a species of flowering plant in the plantain family known by several common names including neckweed, American speedwell, purslane speedwell and hairy purslane speedwell. It is native to the Americas, and is known on other continents as an introduced species and a common weed. It can be weedy in its native range as well, growing on roadsides, on fields, and in other disturbed habitat. It is an annual herb growing from a taproot. The two subspecies are defined generally on the basis of hairiness: ssp. xalapensis is coated in glandular hairs and ssp. peregrina is a hairless variety. The plant produces erect stems up to about 30 centimeters tall. The leaves vary in shape from linear to lance-shaped to spoon-shaped with smooth or serrated edges; the lower leaves are borne on petioles. The inflorescence is a loose terminal raceme of flowers and lance-shaped bracts. The flowers are generally white and 2 or 3 millimeters wide.

External links
Jepson Manual Treatment: ssp. xalapensis
Missouri Plants Photo Profile
Washington Burke Museum
Photo gallery

peregrina
Flora of North America
Flora of South America
Plants described in 1753
Taxa named by Carl Linnaeus